Alessandro Bertolini (born 27 July 1971 in Rovereto, Italy) is an Italian professional road racing cyclist, who last rode for the UCI Professional Continental cycling team .  He is also known in Italy as "Alex" Bertolini.

Major results

1996
 1st, Stage 1, Euskal Bizikleta
1997
 1st, Stage 2, Giro di Sardegna
 1st, Paris–Brussels
 10th, Giro di Lombardia
1998
 7th, Paris–Tours
1999
 1st, Schynberg Rundfahrt
2000
1st, Stage 3, Tour of Austria
1st, Stage 8, Peace Race
2001
 1st, Circuito de Getxo
2003
 1st, Giro del Piemonte
2004
 1st Overall, Giro della Provincia Di Lucca
 1st, Stage 3
2005
 1st, Coppa Sabatini
2006
 1st, Coppa Agostoni
 1st, Stage 4, Circuit de la Sarthe
2007
 1st, UCI Europe Tour
 1st, Giro dell'Appennino
 1st, Coppa Agostoni
 1st, Trittico Lombardo
 1st, Giro del Veneto
 1st, Coppa Placci
 1st, Stage 1a, Settimana internazionale di Coppi e Bartali
2008
 1st, stage 11, Giro d'Italia
 1st, Giro dell'Appennino
2010
 1st, Stage 3, Giro del Trentino
 3rd, Giro dell'Appennino

External links

1971 births
Living people
Italian male cyclists
Italian Giro d'Italia stage winners
People from Rovereto
Sportspeople from Trentino
Cyclists from Trentino-Alto Adige/Südtirol